The 1982 Barking and Dagenham Borough Council election took place on 6 May 1982 to elect members of Barking and Dagenham London Borough Council in London, England. The whole council was up for election and the Labour Party stayed in overall control of the council.

Background
124 candidates nominated in total. Labour again ran a full slate and was the only party to do so. By contrast the Conservative Party ran only 34 candidates and the SDP-Liberal Alliance 22.

Election result
Labour continued to win a large majority of seats - 37 out of 48. The Conservatives and the Residents Association each held their three seats. The SDP–Liberal Alliance won three seats and two Independents were also elected. Thus the new council included four parties for the first time since its formation in 1964.

Ward results

Abbey

Alibon

Cambell

Chadwell Heath

Eastbrook

Eastbury

Fanshawe

Gascoigne

Goresbrook

Heath

Longbridge

Manor

Marks Gate

Parsloes

River

Thames

Triptons

Valence

Village

By-elections between 1982 and 1986

Manor

The by-election was called following the death of Cllr. Albert E. Ball.

Chadwell Heath

The by-election was called following the resignation of Cllr. William Hibble.

Longbridge

The by-election was called following the resignation of Cllr. Edward J. Reed.

References

1982
1982 London Borough council elections
May 1982 events in the United Kingdom